The 2019 ITTF World Tour Grand Finals was the final competition of the 2019 ITTF World Tour, the International Table Tennis Federation's professional table tennis world tour. It was the 24th edition of the competition, and was held from 12–15 December in Zhengzhou, China.

The competition featured events in five categories: men's singles, women's singles, men's doubles, women's doubles and mixed doubles.

Events

Qualification

Players earned points based on their performances in the singles and doubles tournaments at the 12 events of the 2019 ITTF World Tour. The top 16 men's and women's singles players, and the top eight men's, women's and mixed doubles pairs who satisfied the qualification criteria will be invited to compete.

Tournament format

The singles and doubles tournaments consisted of knockout draws, with 16 players starting each of the singles events and eight pairs starting each of the doubles events. The seedings for the tournament draws were based on final tour standings, not the official ITTF world ranking.

Men's singles

Players

Draw

Women's singles

Players

Draw

Men's doubles

Players

Draw

Women's doubles

Players

Draw

Mixed doubles

Players

Draw

ITTF Star Awards

The 2019 ITTF Star Awards ceremony was held at the JW Marriott Hotel in Zhengzhou on 11 December.

Awards were handed out in seven categories:

Male Table Tennis Star:  Ma Long
Female Table Tennis Star:  Liu Shiwen
Male Para Table Tennis Star:  Thomas Schmidberger
Female Para Table Tennis Star:  Giada Rossi
Table Tennis Star Coach:  Bladimir Díaz
Table Tennis Breakthrough Star:  Lily Zhang
Table Tennis Star Point:  Fan Zhendong & Xu Xin at the 2019 Japan Open

See also

2019 World Table Tennis Championships
2019 ITTF Team World Cup
2019 ITTF Men's World Cup
2019 ITTF Women's World Cup

References

External links

International Table Tennis Federation

2019
World Tour Grand Finals
ITTF World Tour Grand Finals
Table tennis competitions in China
International sports competitions hosted by China
ITTF World Tour Grand Finals